Stirling City is a census-designated place in Butte County, California, located on Paradise Ridge in the western foothills of the Sierra Nevada. Contrary to its name, Stirling City is not a city. Its ZIP Code is 95978 and area code 530. It lies at an elevation of 3570 feet (1088 m). Stirling City had a population of 295 at the 2010 census.

It is built around a loop (which terminates a winding spur line) of the Southern Pacific Railroad, built to collect lumber from the Lassen National Forest.

History
It was founded in 1903 by the Diamond Match Company of Barberton, Ohio, as a center for processing cut lumber from the surrounding forests.  Diamond Match official Fred Clough named the city, taking the name from the boiler used at Diamond's Baberton plant, made by the Stirling Boiler Company.

The sawmill closed in the early 1970s.  The land surrounding Stirling City is still harvested for timber, and the cleared area is farmed for cattle, fruit, and nuts.

A post office opened in 1903.

Demographics
The 2010 United States Census reported that Stirling City had a population of 295. The racial makeup of Stirling City was 264 (89.5%) White, 1 (0.3%) African American, 11 (3.7%) Native American, 0 (0.0%) Asian, 0 (0.0%) Pacific Islander, 1 (0.3%) from other races, and 18 (6.1%) from two or more races. Hispanic or Latino of any race were 17 persons (5.8%).

The Census reported that 295 people (100% of the population) lived in households, 0 (0%) lived in non-institutionalized group quarters, and 0 (0%) were institutionalized.

There were 117 households, out of which 34 (29.1%) had children under the age of 18 living in them, 49 (41.9%) were opposite-sex married couples living together, 14 (12.0%) had a female householder with no husband present, 12 (10.3%) had a male householder with no wife present.  There were 11 (9.4%) unmarried opposite-sex partnerships, and 0 (0%) same-sex married couples or partnerships. 34 households (29.1%) were made up of individuals, and 8 (6.8%) had someone living alone who was 65 years of age or older. The average household size was 2.52.  There were 75 families (64.1% of all households); the average family size was 3.07.

The population was spread out, with 76 people (25.8%) under the age of 18, 19 people (6.4%) aged 18 to 24, 62 people (21.0%) aged 25 to 44, 94 people (31.9%) aged 45 to 64, and 44 people (14.9%) who were 65 years of age or older.  The median age was 41.1 years. For every 100 females, there were 107.7 males.  For every 100 females age 18 and over, there were 104.7 males.

The homeowner vacancy rate was 2.7%; the rental vacancy rate was 6.1%.  164 people (55.6% of the population) lived in owner-occupied housing units and 131 people (44.4%) lived in rental housing units.

Climate
Stirling City is categorized as being within the 8a USDA hardiness zone, meaning temperatures can get as low as 10 to 15 °F.

On average, there are 4 days each year where the temperature goes above 100 F. There are also 2 days each year where the temperature drops below 20 F.

In popular culture
 Stirling City, CA, is depicted as a location in early stories of the Slender Man internet mythology.

See also

References

External links

 Stirling City community website
 Stirling City Historical Society website
 Details of Stirling City

Census-designated places in Butte County, California
Populated places in the Sierra Nevada (United States)
Populated places established in 1903
1903 establishments in California
Census-designated places in California